This article lists diplomatic missions accredited to Liechtenstein. The Principality of Liechtenstein is one of only two sovereign countries in the world, the other being the Vatican City, without a resident embassy or consulate located within its territory. Eighty-six countries have ambassadors accredited to Liechtenstein, with most being resident in Bern, Vienna or Berlin.

Honorary Consulates 

Resident in Vaduz unless otherwise noted

 (Mauren)
 (Schaan)
 (Triesen)
 (Schaan)

 (Triesen)
 (Ruggell)

 (Balzers)

 (Schaan)
 (Schaan)
 (Ruggell)
 (Balzers)
 (Triesen)
 (Triesenberg)
 (Schaan)

 (Schaan)
 
 (Bendern)
 (Ruggell)

 (Triesen)

Consulates General
Accredited to Liechtenstein.  Resident in Zürich unless noted

 (Bern)

 (Bern)

 (Bern)
 (Küsnacht)
 (Geneva)

 (Bern)

Non-resident embassies
(Resident in Bern unless otherwise noted)

 (Andorra la Vella)

 (Berlin)

 (Vienna)

 (Vienna)
 (Berlin)

 (Geneva)

 (Geneva)

 (Berlin)

 (Vienna)

 (Berlin)

 (Berlin)

 (Geneva)

 (Geneva)

 (Geneva)
 (Geneva)
 (Vienna)

 (Vienna)

 (Geneva)
 (Geneva)

 (Valletta)

 (Geneva)

 (Berlin)

 (Geneva)
 (Vienna)

 (Paris)

 (Geneva)
 (Geneva)

 (Vienna)

 (Geneva)

 (Geneva)
 (Geneva)
 (Geneva)

 (Geneva)

 (Vienna)

 (Vienna)

See also
 Foreign relations of Liechtenstein
 List of diplomatic missions of Liechtenstein

Notes

External links
 Diplomatisches und konsularisches Corps - Protokoll der Regierung

References

Foreign relations of Liechtenstein
Diplomatic missions
Liechtenstein
Diplomatic missions